The Autumn Heart is a 1999 American drama film directed by Steven Maler and starring Tyne Daly and Ally Sheedy. It was screened at the 1999 Toronto International Film Festival, where it won the Golden Space Needle award for Best Canadian Feature Film. In 2000, it received the Association for Canadian Cinema and Television's David Cronenberg Award of Excellence for Maler's visual cinematography.

Plot

Cast
Tyne Daly as Ann
Ally Sheedy as Deborah
Jack Davidson as Lee
Davidlee Willson as Daniel
Marla Sucharetza as Diane
Marceline Hugot as Donna
Will Lyman as Doctor

References

External links

American drama films
1990s English-language films
1990s American films